The following are lists of individual weapons used by the New Zealand Defence Force.

Assault Rifles, Sniper Rifles 
Currently In service

Retired

Sidearms 
In service

Retired

Shotguns
In service

Retired

Submachine guns
In service

Retired

Machine guns
Currently In Service

Retired

Grenade launchers 
Current

Retired

Mortar 
Current

Retired

Anti-armour
Current

Retired

Anti-personnel
Current

Retired

References

Weapons of New Zealand
New Zealand